Eddie Miles (born September 13, 1968) is a former American football linebacker who played one season with the Pittsburgh Steelers of the National Football League (NFL). He was drafted by the Steelers in the tenth round of the 1990 NFL Draft. He played college football at the University of Minnesota and attended Miami Springs High School in Miami Springs, Florida.

In 1992, he began his career with the Minnesota Department of Corrections. He is currently the warden at Minnesota Correctional Facility – St. Cloud.

References

External links
Just Sports Stats
Fanbase profile

Living people
1968 births
Players of American football from Miami
American football linebackers
Minnesota Golden Gophers football players
Pittsburgh Steelers players
Miami Springs Senior High School alumni